West FM is an Independent Local Radio station based in Glasgow, Scotland, owned and operated by Bauer as part of the Hits Radio network. It broadcasts to Ayrshire and South West Scotland.

As of September 2022, the station has a weekly audience of 92,000 listeners according to RAJAR.

Programming
Local programming is currently produced and broadcast from West FM's studios in Clydebank from 6am-10am on weekdays and 6-9am on Saturdays. The station's local presenters are Billy Kirkwood (weekday breakfast) and Ali Wright (Saturday breakfast).

At all other times, West FM airs networked programming from Clyde 1 in Clydebank, Forth 1 in Edinburgh Tay FM in Dundee and Hits Radio in Manchester.

On Monday 10 July 2017, West FM ceased broadcasting from Ayr and moved its studio output to Clyde 1's Clydebank studios. The station retains its local breakfast, albeit presented from Clydebank, with news, sales and charity staff based in Prestwick.

News and Sport
West FM broadcasts local news bulletins hourly. Headlines are broadcast on the half hour during weekday breakfast and drivetime shows, alongside sport and traffic bulletins.

National bulletins from Sky News Radio are carried overnight with bespoke networked Scottish bulletins at weekends, produced from Radio Clyde's newsroom in Clydebank.

See also
 West Sound (Ayrshire)
 West Sound (Dumfries and Galloway)

References

External links
 

Bauer Radio
Hits Radio
Radio stations in Scotland
Radio stations established in 1997